Fenc Fiji is a Non-Political, Non-Profit, Cause Oriented, and voluntary organization with a mission to provide education and related support to the underprivileged children of the Fiji Islands. It is a locally based, national NGO founded in 2009 to address the issues of poverty reduction through the provision of education and related support to poor school children in Fiji.

Fence Fiji offers scholarships and related support to children of the poorest of the poor families, which have been identified as Deceased parent(s) where the child is living under the care of a widow, widower or family member earning a weekly income below $100; Families with cash flow income below $100/week with one or several children with disabilities; children with one or both parents in prison; children of farm labourers/seasonal labourers engaged in piece-meal work in daily rates of $10–$15; children whose parent or parents with severe chronic illnesses or disabilities; children being raised by a single parent (widow/widower) with basic education, dependent upon support system; high risk families by loss of property through fire or displacement; children being forced to work and earn a living for ageing or severely ill/disabled parent/guardian.

Support from Fenc Fiji covers tuition at approved, zoned schools; and school supplies such as but not limited to books, bags, shoes, stationary, and uniforms. Fenc Fiji ONLY assists children from Class 1 – Form 7; excludes Tertiary, Kindergarten and boarding schools unless cases of death, distance or emergencies. Fenc Fiji attempts to cover the entire Fiji Islands, with 3 Divisional Officers. The Nadi office covers the entire Western Division; the Labasa office covers the entire Northern Division and the office, and the Suva office covering the Central/Eastern Division.

References

External links 
- FENC Fiji assists 970 kids
- Bags and paint gift
- FENC Fiji appoints national co-ordinator
- FENC Fiji calls for support
- FENC Fiji receives donation
- BSP donates $10,000 to FENC FIJI
- Westpac gives to needy children
- Westpac, FENC help children in Rakiraki
- Dulux Paints donates to schools

Educational organisations based in Fiji
Charities based in Fiji